Trask Coliseum is a 5,200-seat multi-purpose arena in Wilmington, North Carolina.

The coliseum was opened in 1977 and named after Raiford Graham Trask, a trustee of Wilmington College.

It is home to the University of North Carolina at Wilmington Seahawks basketball team, as well as some graduations for New Hanover County high schools.

The hard rock group Cinderella performed at the arena on September 1, 1989.

See also
 List of NCAA Division I basketball arenas

References

Basketball venues in North Carolina
Indoor arenas in North Carolina
College basketball venues in the United States
Sports venues in Wilmington, North Carolina
UNC Wilmington Seahawks
1977 establishments in North Carolina
Sports venues completed in 1977